Artifice Studio is a Canadian video game development company based just south of Montreal in Longueuil, Quebec. It was founded in 2010 and currently consists of eight employees in the greater Montreal area and other locations. Several of the team members are former developers from Electronic Arts Montreal, which developed the Army of Two series and was later closed in 2013.

Their first game, Sang-Froid: Tales of Werewolves, received generally favorable reviews, and was nominated for a number of Canadian Videogame Awards.

In June 2014, Artifice Studio announced their next game, Conflicks. A cinematic trailer was released June 12. Set during a re-imagined French Revolution, Conflicks is a physics-based RTS in development for PC, Mac and Linux. The game was released to Steam on November 5, 2015.

Titles
 Sang-Froid: Tales of Werewolves (2013)
 Conflicks (2015)

References

External links
 

Companies based in Longueuil
Canadian companies established in 2010
Video game companies of Canada
Video game development companies